Abdessamad Chahiri (born 17 May 1982) is an international Moroccan footballer who plays for Olympique Khouribga.

He transferred to FAR Rabat from Difaa El Jadida in summer 2008.

References

External links

1982 births
Living people
Moroccan footballers
Morocco international footballers
2008 Africa Cup of Nations players
Raja CA players
AS FAR (football) players
Difaâ Hassani El Jadidi players
Olympique Club de Khouribga players
Association football defenders